Burt Balaban (March 6, 1922 – October 14, 1965) was an American film producer and director.

Biography
Balaban was born to a Jewish family, the son of Tillie (nee Urkov) from her first marriage, and stepson of Barney Balaban, longtime President of Paramount Pictures.  He was the nephew of Elmer Balaban, the nephew of A. J. Balaban, the brother of author Judy Balaban, and the cousin of actor Bob Balaban of Close Encounters of the Third Kind (1977) and Gosford Park (2001).

He was born in Chicago and graduated from Roanoke College. During World War Two he was a combat photographer with the Marines.

Selected filmography
Phantom Caravan (1954) – executive producer
The Sergeant and the Spy (TV movie) (1954) (producer) 
Amiable Lady (1954) (TV movie) (producer) 
The Lie (1954) (TV movie) (producer) 
Double Barrel Miracle (1954) (TV movie) – producer 
Stranger from Venus (1954) a.k.a. Immediate Disaster – producer, director
Diplomatic Passport (1954) – producer
Eight Witnesses (1954) (TV) – executive producer
Lady of Vengeance (1957) – producer, director
High Hell (1958) – producer, director
Murder, Inc. (1960) – producer, director
Mad Dog Coll (1961) – director
The Gentle Rain (1966) – producer, director

References

External links 

1922 births
1965 deaths
American film producers
Film directors from Illinois
Balaban family
20th-century American Jews
Place of death missing
People from Chicago
United States Marine Corps personnel of World War II
World War II photographers